Masala (Marathi: मसाला) is a 2012 Marathi film directed by Sandesh Kulkarni and written by Girish Kulkarni. It is Kulkarni's directorial debut. The film is loosely based on the life story of Hukmichand Chordia of Pravin Masalewale fame.

Synopsis 

A couple is forced to repeatedly move in search of sustainable business ventures. They live in constant fear of meeting their creditors, whose money they spent in unfruitful investments. When the couple meets another couple, things start changing for the better by following the wise counsel of their new acquaintances. The latter part of the movie showcases these changes.

Reception 

The movie was well received by the audience and appreciated by critics.

Cast 
 Girish Kulkarni
 Amruta Subhash
 Mohan Agashe
 Dilip Prabhavalkar
 Hrishikesh Joshi
 Shashank Shende
 Pravin Tarde
 Neha Shitole
 Alok Rajwade

References

External links
 

2010s Marathi-language films
2012 films
Films scored by Anand Modak